Dekasegi is a term that is used in Brazil to refer to people, primarily Japanese Brazilians, who have migrated to Japan, having taken advantage of Japanese citizenship or nisei visa and immigration laws to work short-term in Japan.

The original Japanese word  roughly translates as "working away from home". This can cause irritation to those of Japanese descent who were born abroad, but have come to regard Japan as their permanent home and therefore object to being regarded by Japanese (in Japan) as gaijin or foreigners.

There are approximately 200,000 such people in Japan from Brazil alone.

Language
Some Brazilians are bilingual in Japanese and Portuguese, but many are monolingual in Portuguese alone when they first come to Japan and face additional challenges due to this language barrier.
Many code-switch to Japanese when speaking Portuguese.

See also
Ethnic groups of Japan
Issei, Nisei, Sansei, Yonsei, and Gosei
Japanese Brazilian
Japanese people
Language minority students in Japanese classrooms
Migrant worker

References

External links
Japanese Ministry of Foreign Affairs (MOFA): Future Policy Regarding Cooperation with Overseas Communities of Nikkei
Portal for 100-20 years of immigration between Japan and Brazil, Rare pictures

Brazilian diaspora in Japan
Society of Japan
Ethnic groups in Japan
Migrant workers